The 2013 BWF Para-Badminton World Championships were held from 5 to 10 November 2013 in Dortmund, Germany.

Medalists
23 events were contested at the championships.

Men's events

Women's events

Mixed events

Medal table

See also
2013 BWF World Championships

References

BWF Para-Badminton World Championships
2013 in badminton
2013 in German sport
International sports competitions hosted by Germany